Ewen may refer to: 

Ewen, a masculine given name 

Places
Ewen, Gloucestershire, England
Ewen, Michigan, United States